The Arusnates were an ancient people inhabiting the eastern shores of Lacus Benacus (Lake Garda), northwest of Verona, at the time of contact with the Romans. The Romans named the territory Pagus Arusnatium which roughly corresponds to the modern Valpolicella district of Italy. Not much is known about the Arusnates; attempts to link them to Etruscans or Rhaetians have been unsuccessful due to lack of evidence. The names of (some of) their gods and goddesses have been preserved (through the Latin): Cuslano, Imnhagalle, Lualda, Schnagalle, and Udisna Augusta.

References
Valpolicella history and culture site
Ettore de Ruggiero, Dizionario epigrafico di antichità romane
Richard Talbert, Barrington Atlas of the Greek and Roman World, p. 39

Ancient peoples of Italy
History of Veneto